Big Daddy Weave is an American contemporary Christian band from Mobile, Alabama composed of Mike Weaver, Joe Shirk, Jeremy Redmon, and Brian Beihl. They are signed to Fervent Records.

History 

The band members met in college while attending the University of Mobile. Mike Weaver had been serving as worship leader of a Pensacola, Florida church and attending a community college in the area. He came to the university at the urging of his pastor, and studied voice.

In 2006 and 2007, Big Daddy Weave toured with Mark Schultz on his "Broken and Beautiful" Tour. In 2009, they headlined the "What Life Would Be Like" Tour with guest musician Josh Wilson.

On June 25, 2019, band frontman Mike Weaver announced that he would be releasing his autobiographical book, I Am Redeemed, on September 3, 2019.

Bassist Jay Weaver died from COVID-19 on January 2, 2022, at the age of 42.

Band members

Current
 Mike Weaver – lead vocals, guitar (1998–present)
 Joe Shirk – keyboards, saxophones, backing vocals (1998–present)
 Jeremy Redmon – guitar, backing vocals (1998–present)
 Brian Beihl – drums (2013–present)

Former
 Jeff Jones – drums (1998–2013)
 Jay Weaver – bass guitar, vocals (1998–2022)

Discography

Studio albums

Compilation albums

Christmas albums

Singles

Promotional singles

Music videos
 "Every Time I Breathe" (July 26, 2006)
 "What Life Would be Like" (September 9, 2008)
 "Redeemed" (May 3, 2012)
 "Overwhelmed" (August 7, 2014)
 "My Story" (August 31, 2015)
 "Jesus I Believe" (April 12, 2016)
 "Alive" (February 8, 2019)

Album contributions
 WOW Worship Yellow - "Audience of One" (2003)
 Absolute Smash Hits - "In Christ" (2004)
 WOW Worship Red - "Word of God Speak" (2004)
 WOW Hits 2006 - "You're Worthy of My Praise" (2005)
 WOW Christmas: Green - "Go Tell It on the Mountain" (2005)
 WOW Hits 2007 - "Without You" (2006)
 WOW Worship Aqua - "Let It Rise" (2006)
 WOW Hits 2008 - "Every Time I Breathe" (2007)
 The Nativity Story: Sacred Songs - "The Virgin's Lullaby" (2007)
 WOW Hits 2010 - "What Life Would Be Like" (2009)
 WOW Hits 2011 - "You Found Me" (2010)
 WOW Hits 2013 - "Love Come to Life" (2012)
 WOW Hits 2014 - "Redeemed" (2013)
 WOW Hits 2015 - "The Only Name" (2014)
 WOW Hits 2016 - "Overwhelmed" (2015)
 WOW Hits 2017 - "My Story" (2016)
 WOW Hits 2018 - "The Lion and the Lamb" (2017)
 WOW Hits 2019 - "Jesus I Believe" (2018)

Awards

 Received the Dove Award for Christmas Album of the Year in 2010
 Honored two years in a row at ASCAP's 2003 and 2004 Christian Music Awards
 2003 Nomination for Dove Award for Songwriter of the Year
Received the K-Love Fan Award for "Song of the Year" for Redeemed in 2013
 2016 Dove Award Nomination for "Pop/Contemporary Recorded Song of the Year" for My Story
Received the Rich Mullins Artist Impact Award in 2016.
Received the K-Love Fan Award for "Worship Song of the Year" for Lion and the Lamb in 2017
2018 K-Love Fan Award Nomination for "Group or Duo of the Year"
2018 K-Love Fan Award Nomination for "Worship Song of the Year" for Jesus I Believe

Achievements

 "Audience of One" one of the top 25 most performed ASCAP songs of 2003
 Featured on Dove Hits 2003
 Featured on WOW Worship Yellow
 "In Christ" appeared on R&R's AC chart for 24 weeks, peaking at No. 2, becoming the highest charting AC single for a new artist in 2002
 "In Christ" one of the top 25 most performed ASCAP songs of 2002
 Debut project, "One And Only", debuted in SoundScan's Christian Top 5, the highest debut for a new artist in 2002
 "One And Only" remained in the SoundScan's Christian Top20 for six consecutive weeks
 Performed the song "Redeemed" on the 44th Annual GMA Dove Awards (2013)

Notes

References

External links
 
 
 

2002 establishments in Alabama
American Christian rock groups
Fervent Records artists
Musical groups established in 2002
Rock music groups from Alabama
Performers of contemporary Christian music
University of Mobile alumni
Musicians from Mobile, Alabama